This is a list of gliders/sailplanes of the world, (this reference lists all gliders with references, where available) 
Note: Any aircraft can glide for a short time, but gliders are designed to glide for longer.

D

d'André
 d'André Aérovoile (1908 glider)

D'Otreppe
(Bernard D'Otreppe)
 D'Otreppe biplane hang glider

Daams
(Fred Daams)
 Daams Falcon

Daimler
(Hans Klemm / Daimler-Motoren-Gesellschaft Werke - Daimler Aircraft Company)
 Daimler L15

Danieli
 Danieli Piuma

DAR 
(Drjavna Aeroplane Robotilnitsa – ДАР Държавната аеропланна работилница)
 DAR Albatros Albatros
 DAR Chuchuliga Chuchuliga
 DAR Rilski Orel Rilski Orel
 DAR Zdravka Toprakchiev – ДАР Здравка Топракчиев
 DAR Zdravka Vekilski – ДАР Здравка Векилски
 Lazarov Drangov – Zvetan Lazarov

Darmstadt 
(Darmstädter Flugsport-Vereinigung)
 Darmstadt FSV-2
 Darmstadt FSV-2c
 Darmstadt FSV-8
 Darmstadt FSV-X

Dansk Aero
(Dansk Aero Verkstad)
 Dansk Aero 2G

Dart 
(Dart Aircraft Ltd)
 Dart Cambridge
 Dart Totternhoe
 Dart Grunau Baby
 Dart Zogling
 Dart replica Lilienthal glider
 Dart replica Cayley glider
 Dart replica Wright glider

Dart
(Bob Dart)
 Dart Aero-5

Davies
 Davies Glider-1
 Davies Glider-2

Davies-Nicholls
(Ken Davies & Alf Nicholls)
 Davies-Nicholls Primary

Davis-Costin
(P. Davis & F. Costin)
 Davis-Costin Condor
 Davis Condor 2

de Beaurein-John
(Janusz de Beaurein & Edmund John)
 de Beaurein-John 1909 glider

de Glymes
(de Glymes / SABCA - Société Anonyme Belge de Constructions Aéronautiques)
 de Glymes Colanhan

de Havilland
(de Havilland Aircraft Co)
 de Havilland DH.52

de Havilland Australia 
(de Havilland Aircraft Co)
 de Havilland DHA G-2
 de Havilland DHA G-2 Glas II
 de Havilland EG-1
 de Havilland EG-2

de Monge
(Louis de Monge & Daniel Montague)
 de Monge DMP-1

de Rouge
(Charles de Rouge)
 de Rougé Elytroplan Sigma

Degasperi
(Luis E. Degasperi)
 Degásperi Primario

Degrandi
(Howard V. DeGrandi)
 Degrandi Slope Soarer

Dehn
(Karl Dehn)
 Dehn Ringwing

Delanne
(Maurice Delanne)
 Delanne DL-190	
 Delanne DL-30 P2
 Delanne DL-60 E1

Delone
(N.B. Delone)
 Delone 1909 glider – Делоне 1909

Delta Sailplane Corporation
Delta Sailplane Nomad

Démouveaux
 Démouveaux Aviator 1901

Descole
(Ovidio Descole)
 Descole Tío Pelado

Dessau
(Dessau F.V / Maschinenbau-Schule Dessau)
 Dessau Agfa

Detroit
(Detroit Aircraft Corporation)
 Detroit G1 Gull

Detter
 Detter zmaj

Devon Gliding Club
 Dickson Primary

Dewoitine
 Dewoitine P-1
 Dewoitine P-2
 Dewoitine P-3
 Dewoitine P-4

DFS
(Deutsche Forschungsanstalt für Segelflug – German research institute for gliders)
 DFS 38 Quo Vadis
 DFS 40
 DFS 42 Kormoran
 DFS 54
 DFS 194
 DFS 203
 DFS 230
 DFS 230 V7 (a completely new design)
 DFS 230 F
 DFS 331
 DFS B6, high-performance sailplane
 DFS Bombenjäger
 DFS E 32, sailplane
 DFS Einheitsschulflugzeug (Standard Flight Trainer), glider, basic flight trainer (foldable tail)
 DFS Fafnir
 DFS Fafnir 2 São Paulo
 DFS Fliege IIa (Fly), sailplane
 DFS Ha III, high-performance sailplane
 DFS Habicht
 DFS Hangwind, basic trainer (twin-boom)
 DFS Jacht 71 (Yacht), sailplane
 DFS Kranich-II
 DFS Kranich
 DFS Maikäfer
 DFS Olympia Meise
 DFS Präsident (President), high-performance sailplane
 DFS Reiher
 DFS Rhönbussard
 DFS Rhönsperber
 DFS Motorsperber
 DFS Schulgleiter SG.38
 DFS Seeadler
 DFS Sperber Junior
 DFS Sperber Senior
 DFS Stanavo, high-performance sailplane
 DFS Weihe

DG
(DG Flugzeugbau GmbH)
 Glaser-Dirks DG-100
 Glaser-Dirks DG-101
 Glaser-Dirks DG-200
 Glaser-Dirks DG-202
 Glaser-Dirks DG-300 Elan
 Glaser-Dirks DG-303
 Glaser-Dirks DG-400
 Glaser-Dirks DG-500 Elan
 Glaser-Dirks DG-505 Elan Orion
 Glaser-Dirks DG-600
 DG Flugzeugbau DG-800
 DG Flugzeugbau DG-800B
 DG Flugzeugbau DG-800S
 DG Flugzeugbau DG-808
 DG Flugzeugbau DG-1000
 DG Flugzeugbau DG-1000T

Diamond Aircraft 
(HOAC AG / Wolf Hoffmann Flugzeugbau AG / Diamond Aircraft Industries)
 H36 Dimona
 H36 Dimona MkII
 H36D Dimona
 H38 Observer
 HK36 Super Dimona
 HK36 Dimona
 HK36R Super Dimona
 HK36TS Super Dimona
 HK36TC Super Dimonah
 HK36TC-100 Super Dimona
 HK36TTS Super Dimona
 HK36TTC Super Dimona
 HK36TTC Eco Dimona
 Diamond DA36 E-Star
 HOAC LF2000

Diana Sailplanes
 Diana-2

Dieder
(Ormand Dieder)
 Dieder glider

Diessner
 Diessner MD-1

Distar Air
Distar UFM-13 Lambada

Dittmar
(Flugzeugbau Heini Dittmar)
(The Condor series were built by several manufacturers)
 Dittmar HD-1 Condor
 Dittmar Condor II
 Dittmar Condor IIA
 Dittmar Condor III
 Dittmar Condor IV
 Dittmar HD-53 Möwe
 Dittmar HD-153 Motor-Möwe
 Dittmar Motor-Condor La Falda

Djurin
 Djurin Komarac I (Ustvari motorizovana Cavka - motorized Cavka glider)

Dobahov
 Dobahov Krymosoaviahim (Добахов)

Dobrovolski
(S. P. Dobrovloski)
 Dobrovolski 1911

Dohnálek
 Dohnálek D-1 Exp.	1922
 Dohnálek D-3 Tyny	1925
 Dohnálek Nina 1925

Doktor Fiberglas
(Ursula Hanle)
 Doktor Fiberglas H 101 Salto

Domenjoz
(John Auguste Domenjoz)
 Domenjoz glider
 Domenjoz Planeur-Voilier

Domrachev
(Y. V. Domrachev)
 Domrachev Leningrad – (Домрачева Ленинград)

Dorset Gliding Club
 Dorsling 1932 glider

DOSAAF
(DOSAAF - Dobrovol'noe Obschestvo Sodesystviya Armii Aviatcii i Flotu - voluntary society for assistance to the army air force and navy)
 DOSAAF Aktivista

Douglas
(Douglas Aircraft Company)
 Douglas XCG-17
 Douglas XCG-19

Drzewiecki
(Jerzy Drzewiecki / Centralne Warsztaty Lotnicze)
 Drzewiecki SL-2 Czarny Kot  – Second Polish Glider Contest No.6 17 May – 15 June 1925

DSK
(Duster Sailplane Kits / Ben Jansson and H. Einar Thor)
 DSK BJ-1 Dynamite
 DSK BJ-1b Duster

DTGL 
(Gian Luigi Della Torre)
 DTGL Fabrizio
 DTGL Sant' Ambrogio

DuPont
(Richard DuPont)
 DuPont Utility

Dunne
(J. W. Dunne)
 Dunne D.1
 Dunne D.4

Dunning
(Dunning / Southdown Gliding Club)
 Dunning 1934 glider

Dunstable
(Dunstable Sailplane co.)
 Dunstable 1939 glider – Dunstable Sailplane Company
 Dunstable Devil – Dunstable Sailplane Company
 Dunstable Hyper-Hols – Dunstable Sailplane Company
 Dunstable Kestrel
 Dunstable Primary
 Dunstable Golden Eagle
 Dunstable Goshawk

Dvořáček
(Břetislav Dvořáček)
 Dvořáček BDV-2

Dzelzcelnieks
 Dzelzcelnieks glider
 Dzelzcelnieks II
 Dzelzcelnieks III

Działowski
(Stanislaw Dzalialowski & Mieczyslaw Dzalialowski)
 Działowski Bydgoszczanka (No.2) – Second Polish Glider Contest 17 May – 15 June 1925

Notes

Further reading

External links

Lists of glider aircraft